The men's 4 × 200 metre freestyle relay competition of the swimming events at the 2011 Pan American Games took place on 19 October at the Scotiabank Aquatics Center. The defending Pan American Games champion is the team from Brazil (Thiago Pereira, Rodrigo Castro, Nicolas Oliveira and Lucas Salatta).

This race consisted of sixteen lengths of the pool. Each of the four swimmers completed four lengths of the pool. The first swimmer had to touch the wall before the second could leave the starting block.

Records
Prior to this competition, the existing world and Pan American Games records were as follows:

Results
All times shown are in minutes.

Heats
The first round was held on October 19.
As only eight teams had entered, the heats served as a ranking round with all eight teams advancing to the final.

Final 
The final was held on October 19.

References

Swimming at the 2011 Pan American Games
4 × 200 metre freestyle relay